Catharina is a feminine given name, the Dutch and Swedish spelling of the name Catherine. In the Netherlands, people use a great number of short forms in daily life, including Carine, Catelijne, Cato, Ina, Ineke, Kaat, Kaatje, Karen, Karin, Katja, Katrien, Katrijn, Kitty, Nienke, Rina, Tineke, Tiny, Toos, Trijn, Trijntje, and many others. People with the name include:

Academics, science 
Catharina C.J.H. "Catrien" Bijleveld (born 1958), Dutch criminologist
Catharina Halkes (1920–2011), Dutch theologian and feminist
Catharina Jantina "Catherine" de Jong (born 1956), Dutch anesthesiologist, drug rehab physician and intensivist
Catharina Geertruida "Catrien" Santing (born 1958), Dutch medievalist
Catharina Stroppel (born 1971), German mathematician
A.P. Catharina "Catharine" van Tussenbroek (1852–1925), Dutch physician and feminist

Arts
Catharina Ahlgren (1734–c. 1800), Swedish feminist writer, poet, translator, editor and journalist
Catharina Backer (1689–1766), Dutch art collector and painter
Catharina S.F. "Kate" Bisschop-Swift (1834–1928), English-born Dutch painter
Catharina Both-van der Eem (1589–1666), Haarlem citizen painted by Frans Hals
Catharina Chen (born 1985), Norwegian classical violinist
Catharina A.P.A. "Kitty" Courbois (1937–2017), Dutch actress
Catharina Irma Dessaur (1931–2002), Dutch writer with the pseudonym Andreas Burnier
Catharina Jacoba Abrahamina Enschedé (1828–1883), Dutch painter
Catharina Regina von Greiffenberg (1633–1694), Austrian poet
Catharina "Nina" Hagen (born 1955), German singer, songwriter, and actress
Catharina van Hemessen (1528–aft.1567), Flemish portrait painter
Catharina Hooft (1618–1691), Dutch patrician painted by Frans Hals
Catharina Hooghsae (1607–1685), Dutch patrician painted by Rembrandt
Catharina van Knibbergen (1630–1675), Dutch landscape painter
Catharina Lescaille (1649–1711), Dutch poet, translator and publisher
Catharina Oostfries (1636–1708), Dutch glass painter
Catharina Peeters (1615–1676), Flemish seascape painter
Catharina Pepijn (1619–1688), Flemish portrait painter
Catharina Pratten (1821–1895), German guitar virtuoso, composer and teacher
Catharina Questiers (1631–1669), Dutch poet and dramatist
Catharina van Rennes (1858–1940), Dutch music educator, soprano and composer
Catharina Julia Roeters van Lennep (1813–1883), Dutch still life painter
Catharina Rozee (1632–1682), Dutch embroidery artist
Catharina Smith (fl.1807–1815), English novelist and actress
Catharina Charlotta Swedenmarck (1744–1813), Swedish-Finnish writer and poet
Catharina Torenberg (1787–1866), Finnish violinist
Catharina Jacoba van Velde (1903–1985), Dutch novelist
Catharina Ykens (1659–?), Flemish still life painter

Politics
Catharina Bråkenhielm (born 1956), Swedish social democratic politician
Catharina Isabella "Ien" Dales (1931–1994), Dutch politician, Minister of the Interior
Catharina Elmsäter-Svärd (born 1965), Swedish politician, Minister for Infrastructure 
Catharina E.G. "Karien" van Gennip (born 1968), Dutch CDA politician
j. Catharina "Tineke" Huizinga (born 1960), Dutch politician, Minister of Environment
Catharina J.E. "Nine" Kooiman (born 1980), Dutch politician and social worker.
Catharina Stopia (fl. 1620–1657), Swedish ambassador to Russia
Catharina "Cathy" Ubels-Veen (1928–2015), Dutch Evangelical politician

Royalty, nobility, court
Catharina-Amalia, Princess of Orange (born 2003), Crown princess of the Netherlands
Catharina Belgica of Nassau (1578–1648), Flemish-born consort and regent of Hanau-Münzenberg
Catharina van Gelre (ca.1440–1497), regent of the Duchy of Guelders 
Catharina Anna Grandon de Hochepied (1767–1803), Hungarian-Swedish noble
Catharina Ulrika Hjort af Ornäs (1767–1837), Swedish noblewoman and murder victim
Catharina van Holland (c.1280–1328), daughter of Floris V, Count of Holland
Catharina Ebba Horn (1720–1781), Swedish noble and mistress of king Frederick I of Swede
Catharina van Kleef (1417–1479), Duchess of Guelders
Catharina Månsdotter (1550–1612), Queen of Sweden
Catharina van Nassau (1543–1624), sister of William I the Silent
Catharina Rickert (1674–1734), official royal mistress of Frederick I of Prussia
H. Catharina L. "Trina" Schneider (1856–1918), Baltic-German tutor at the court of Tsar Nicholas II
Catharina Wallenstedt (1627–1719), Swedish maid of honour to Queen Christina and letter writer
Catharina of Württemberg (1783–1835), Russian-born queen consort of Westphalia

Sports
Catharina Johanna "Toos" Beumer (born 1947), Dutch swimmer
Catharina Clasina "Rini" Dobber (born 1943), Dutch swimmer
Catharina Petronella "Catrien" Eijken (born 1961), Dutch synchronized swimmer 
Catharina "Toos" van den Ende (born 1945), Dutch rower
Catharina Felser (born 1982), German race car driver
Catharina Glassér-Bjerner (born 1964), Swedish alpine skier
Catharina C.M. "Kitty" van Haperen (born 1976), Dutch athlete and bobsledder
Catharina Maria "Toos" van der Klaauw (1915–2011), Dutch fencer
Catharina B.J. "Tineke" Lagerberg (born 1941), Dutch swimmer
Catharina Lindgren (born 1963), Swedish figure skater
Catharina Neelissen (born 1961), Dutch rower
Catharina Wilhelmina "Tini" Wagner (1919–2004), Dutch swimmer

Other
Catharina Besselman (1678-1702), Dutch colonist in the Dutch East Indies
Catharina Bröms (1665–1735), Swedish iron master
Catharina de Chasseur (1490–1541), Dutch counterfeiter
Catharina Cramer (1656–1746), Dutch midwife
Catharina "Carin" du Rietz (1766–1788), Swedish Royal Guard soldier
Catharina Cornelia Hodshon (1768–1829), Dutch heiress and regent of almshouses
Catharina Egges (1750–1824), Dutch publisher
Catharina Freymann (1708–1791), Norwegian pietist leader
Catharina de Grebber (born 1498), Dutch kidnapping victim
Catharina Elisabet Grubb (1721–1788), Swedish-Finnish industrialist
Catharina Haynes (born 1963), United States Circuit Judge 
Catharina Herman (fl. 1604), Dutch heroine of the Eighty Years' War
Catharina Heybeek (1764–1810), Dutch journalist, feminist and editor
Catharina Justander (1723–1778), Swedish-Finnish missionary
Catharina Johanna Koek (1763 - 1843), Dutch governor's wife
Catharina "Trijn" van Leemput (c.1530–1607), Dutch heroine of the Eighty Years' War
Catharina Margaretha Linck (died 1721), Prussian woman executed for sodomy
Catharina "Rina" Lodders (born 1942), Dutch model, Miss World 1962
Catharina Lysholm (1744–1815), Norwegian ship-owner
Catharina Mulder a.k.a. Kaat Mossel (1723–1798), Dutch Orangist activist
Catharina Choi Nunes (born 1990), Korean-Brazilian model
Catharina Roodzant (1896–1999), Dutch chess master
Catharina Rose (fl. 1587), Dutch heroin in the Eighty Years' War
Catharina de San Joan (1605–1688), India-born anchorite and visionary
Catharina Serafin (fl. 1892), Prussian medical patient
Catharina Svensson (born 1982), Danish model, Miss Earth 2001
Catharina Wahllund (1771–1843), Swedish-Finnish restaurateur

See also
Catharina (crater), a lunar impact crater, in 1935 named after Catherine of Alexandria
Catharina (ship), a German barque built in 1810
Catarina (disambiguation)
Catherina (and similar spellings)
Katharina

Dutch feminine given names
Swedish feminine given names

ja:カタリナ